S. Madheswaran is an Indian politician and former member of the Tamil Nadu Legislative Assembly from the Attur constituency. He represented the Anna Dravida Munnetra Kazhagam party.

References 

All India Anna Dravida Munnetra Kazhagam politicians
Living people
Year of birth missing (living people)
Place of birth missing (living people)
Tamil Nadu MLAs 2011–2016